The Men's 100m Breaststroke event at the 2003 Pan American Games took place on August 12, 2003 (Day 11 of the Games).

Medalists

Records

Results

Notes

References
usaswimming
Records

Breaststroke, Men's 100m